Nafees is a common South Asian name. The feminine is Nafeesa.

Nafees may refer to:

First name
Nafees Iqbal (born 1985), Bangladeshi cricketer
Nafees Din (born 1981), English cricketer

Last name
Shahriar Nafees (born 1986), Bangladeshi cricketer

See also
Ibn Al-Nafees Hospital, a major hospital in Marrakesh, Morocco